Valery Chkalov (1904–1938) was a Soviet aircraft test pilot. His name was given to multiple objects in the former Soviet Union, including
 Chkalov (Tashkent Metro), a station of the Tashkent Metro, now Do'stlik
Chkalov, Armenia, a town
Chkalov, Kyrgyzstan, a village in Jalal-Abad Region, Kyrgyzstan
Chkalov, Allaikhovsky District, Sakha Republic, a village in Russia
Chkalov, Khangalassky District, Sakha Republic, a village in Russia
Chkalov, Nyurbinsky District, Sakha Republic, a village in Russia
Chkalov, former name of the town Buston, Sughd Region, Tajikistan
Chkalov Island, in the Sea of Okhotsk
Orenburg, named Chkalov from 1938 to 1957, a city in Russia and the capital of Orenburg Oblast
 Orenburg Oblast, formerly Chkalov Oblast

See also
Chkalovka
Chkalovsk (disambiguation)
Chkalovsky (disambiguation)
Valery Chkalov (film), a 1941 film